Myatt Creek is a stream in northeastern Fulton County, Arkansas and southeastern Howell County, Missouri.

Myatt Creek has the name of a pioneer settler who is said to be buried along its course.

See also
List of rivers of Arkansas
List of rivers of Missouri

References

Rivers of Fulton County, Arkansas
Rivers of Howell County, Missouri
Rivers of Arkansas
Rivers of Missouri